Fariborz Esmaeili (1 July 1940 – 7 April 2020) was an Iranian football midfielder who played for Iran in the 1964 Summer Olympics. He also played for Taj SC.

He died on April 7, 2020.

Record at Olympic Games

References

External links
 
 
 TeamMelli.com
 FIFA.com

Iran international footballers
Iranian footballers
Esteghlal F.C. players
1940 births
2020 deaths
Asian Games silver medalists for Iran
Olympic footballers of Iran
Asian Games medalists in football
Footballers at the 1966 Asian Games
1968 AFC Asian Cup players
Association football midfielders
Footballers at the 1964 Summer Olympics
Medalists at the 1966 Asian Games